Institute of Chartered Accountants of Belize (ICAB) is a professional accountancy body in Belize. It is the sole organization in Belize with the right to award the Chartered Accountant designation.
ICAB is a member of the Institute of Chartered Accountants of the Caribbean.

References

Belize
Organisations based in Belize